The Voluntary Protection Programs Participants’ Association, Inc. (VPPPA), is a nonprofit association of cooperative safety and health management systems. It organizes the largest VPP education event of the year, and promotes occupational health and safety.

Membership with the association is established on a site-by-site basis. Member sites consist of everything from refineries to office buildings to mobile workforces. There are currently over 2,100 member sites. The organization gives out achievement, outreach and innovation awards, and several scholarships on an annual basis. It holds ten chapter conferences in each of OSHA's regions every year, as well as the Annual National VPPPA Conference.

See also
 Occupational Safety and Health Administration

References

External links
 Voluntary Protection Programs Participants’ Association, Inc.
 Occupational Health and Safety Administration - Voluntary Protection Programs

Non-profit organizations based in Falls Church, Virginia
Occupational safety and health organizations